Don W. Pellum (born January 26, 1962) is a former American football coach. He most recently was the Linebackers coach for the UCLA Bruins football team.

Education and playing career
Pellum was a starting linebacker for Oregon under former head coach Rich Brooks. He earned a pair of undergraduate degrees in telecommunications and film as well as rhetoric and communications, from the University of Oregon in 1985. He also received a minor in sociology. Pellum proceeded to earn his masters in telecommunications and film the following year in addition to completing work toward his Ph.D.

Coaching career
Pellum was a positions coach at the University of Oregon for 23 years; starting as a graduate assistant working with tight ends in 1985, and then coaching safeties and defensive lineman before serving as linebackers coach for 14 seasons.

He had two breaks from Oregon, serving as defensive line coach, strength and conditioning director, and academic coordinator at Willamette University in 1987. From 1990 to 1992, Pellum was the recruiting coordinator at the University of California, as well as the assistant athletics director for student services at Berkeley in 1992 before returning again to the Ducks in 1993.

On January 14, 2014, Pellum was named Oregon's defensive coordinator, replacing his former mentor Nick Aliotti.

On January 4, 2016, following one of the worst defensive seasons in Oregon football history, Pellum was demoted to linebackers coach.

On February 24, 2022 Pellum retired at UCLA after years as linebackers coach.

References

Living people
1962 births
People from Banning, California
Sportspeople from Riverside County, California
Oregon Ducks football coaches
Oregon Ducks football players
Willamette Bearcats football coaches
African-American coaches of American football
21st-century African-American people
20th-century African-American sportspeople